Louise de Montmorency (1496–1547) was a French aristocrat and courtier. She served as Première dame d'honneur to the queen of France, Eleanor of Austria, from 1530 to 1535. She also played an important role within patronage and as a supporter of Calvinism.

Life
She was the daughter of Guillaume de Montmorency and Anne Pot and younger sister of Anne de Montmorency, Constable of France.

In 1530, she was appointed Première dame d'honneur to the new queen, Eleanor of Austria, a new court office installed just a few years earlier, which made her responsible for all of the other ladies-in-waiting of the queen. She retired in 1535 and was replaced by Mme de Givry.

She had considerable patronage power independently of her husband, and had an important role in spreading the influence of Calvinism in France in the 16th Century.

Marriages
Louise married her first husband, Ferri de Mailly, in 1511. This marriage produced a daughter;
 Madeleine de Mailly.

Ferry died in 1513, and Louise remarried in 1514 to Gaspard I de Coligny. From her second marriage she had three sons, all of whom played important roles in the first period of the French Wars of Religion: 
Odet, Cardinal de Châtillon
Gaspard, Admiral of France
François, Seigneur d'Andelot.

Family tree

Notes

Sources

1496 births
1547 deaths
16th-century French people
French nobility
Louise
French suo jure nobility
House of Coligny
French ladies-in-waiting
Court of Francis I of France